The first season of the Albanian competitive reality television series Hell's Kitchen Albania premiered on October 19, 2018 on Top Channel. Renato Mekolli was the host and the head chef. Eri Muhaj and Bleri Dervshi became the sous chefs for the Red Team and Blue Team respectively. Maitre d' was Visi.

On January 4, 2019, chef Renato announced Ervin Mahilaj as the winner.

Chefs

Contestant progress

Team captains

References

External links

2018 Albanian television seasons
2019 Albanian television seasons
Hell's Kitchen (TV series)